Jalan Sambung Kuala Lumpur/Karak–Bentong, Federal Route 121, is a continuous federal road in Pahang, Malaysia.

At most sections, the Federal Route 121 was built under the JKR R5 road standard, allowing maximum speed limit of up to 90 km/h.

List of junctions

References

Malaysian Federal Roads